Robert Nash (born March 26, 1990) is an American mixed martial artist currently competing in the Welterweight division of Bellator MMA. A professional competitor since 2010, he has formerly competed for the UFC and RFA.

Background
Born and raised in Roseville, Michigan, Nash started wrestling at the age of five. He attended Roseville High School where he competed in wrestling and football. During his senior season, Nash compiled a record of 62-1, capturing the state title at 152 lbs. and also had a third-place finish at 140 lbs. during his junior season. After graduating, Nash entertained offers from Division 1 wrestling colleges and chose Lindsey Wilson College where he wrestled for one year with scholarship. Wanting to wrestle in the Big Ten Conference, he transferred to Michigan State University to continue wrestling for the Spartans. After graduating and earning his degree in sociology, he began training for MMA.

Mixed martial arts career

Early career
Nash held an amateur record of 13–0 and was the WXC Amateur Welterweight Champion before making his professional debut in 2010. He compiled a record of 8–1 before being signed by the UFC.

Ultimate Fighting Championship
Nash made his UFC debut against Li Jingliang at UFC on Fox 23 on January 28, 2017. He lost via KO in the second round.

In his second fight for the promotion, Nash faced Danny Roberts on July 16, 2017 at UFC Fight Night: Nelson vs. Ponzinibbio. He lost the fight via knockout in the second round.

Nash faced Song Kenan on November 25, 2017 at UFC Fight Night: Silva vs. Gastelum. He lost the fight via TKO in the first round.

XFC 
Nash made his promotional debut for XFC against Spencer Jebb at XFC 43 on November 11, 2020. He won the bout via TKO in the first round.

XFC Welterweight Tournament
In the semi-finals of the XFC Welterweight Tournament, Nash faced Ryan Dickson at XFC 44 on May 28, 2021. He won the bout via KO in the first round and advanced to the final.

Nash was scheduled to face LaRue Burley on August 6, 2021 at XFC 45 for the XFC welterweight tournament finals. However, roughly two weeks before XFC 45, Burley broke his hand during his last round of hard sparring, there being replaced by Quinton Parks Jr. on short notice in a bout that will not be part of the welterweight tournament. He won the bout via rear naked choke in the first round.

Bellator MMA 
On October 18, 2022, it was announced that Nash had signed a multi-fight contract with Bellator MMA.

Personal life
Nash has four siblings: three brothers and a sister. Two of his brothers, Chris and Kevin, also wrestled for Michigan State.

Nash has a son, Zander (born 2018) with wife Jessica Nash (m.2020).

Mixed martial arts record

|-
|Win
|align=center|12–4
|Quinton Parks Jr.
|Submission (rear-naked choke)
|XFC 45
|
|align=center|1
|align=center|2:08
|Grand Rapids, Michigan, United States
|
|-
|Win
|align=center|11–4
|Ryan Dickson
|TKO (punches)
|XFC 44
|
|align=center|1
|align=center|3:00
|Des Moines, Iowa, United States
|<small>XFC Welterweight Tournament Semi Final
|-
|Win
|align=center|10–4
|Spencer Jebb
|TKO (punches)
|XFC 43
|
|align=center|1
|align=center|3:36
|Atlanta, Georgia, United States
|<small>XFC Welterweight Tournament Quarter Final
|-
|Win
|align=center|9–4
|Mark Stoddard
|TKO (punches)
|WXC 78
|
|align=center|2
|align=center|1:03
|Southgate, Michigan, United States
|
|-
|Loss
|align=center|8–4
|Song Kenan
|TKO (punches)
|UFC Fight Night: Bisping vs. Gastelum
|
|align=center|1
|align=center|0:15
|Shanghai, China
|
|-
|Loss
|align=center|8–3
|Danny Roberts
|KO (punches)
|UFC Fight Night: Nelson vs. Ponzinibbio
|
|align=center|2
|align=center|3:59
|Glasgow, Scotland
|
|-
|Loss
|align=center|8–2
|Li Jingliang 
|KO (punches)
|UFC on Fox: Shevchenko vs. Peña
|
|align=center|2
|align=center|4:45
|Denver, Colorado, United States
|
|-
|Win
|align=center|8–1
|Lewis Gonzalez
|TKO (punches)
|Global Knockout 7
|
|align=center|2
|align=center|0:18
|Jackson, California, United States
|
|-
|Win
|align=center|7–1
|Deray Davis
|TKO (punches)
|RFA 39: Barcelos vs. Moffett
|
|align=center|1
|align=center|0:40
|Hammond, Indiana, United States
|
|-
|Win
|align=center|6–1
|Angelo Trevino
|Submission (guillotine)
|Global Knockout 6
|
|align=center|2
|align=center|3:09
|Jackson, California, United States
|
|-
|Win
|align=center|5–1
|Craig Fruth
|KO (punch)
|HFC 26
|
|align=center|1
|align=center|1:44
|Michigan City, Indiana, United States
|
|-
|Win
|align=center|4–1
|Leonard Simpson
|TKO (punches)
|Triple X Legends 6
|
|align=center|2
|align=center|0:21
|Novi, Michigan, United States
|
|-
|Win
|align=center|3–1
|Rocky Edwards
|Decision (unanimous)
|FCOC IV
|
|align=center|3
|align=center|5:00
|Jacksonville, North Carolina, United States
|
|-
|loss
|align=center|2–1
|Tenyeh Dixon
|Decision (unanimous)
|WXC 55
|
|align=center|3
|align=center|5:00
|Southgate, Michigan, United States
|
|-
|Win
|align=center|2–0
|Marcus Ayub
|Submission (guillotine choke)
|Triple A MMA 10
|
|align=center|1
|align=center|2:22
|Albuquerque, New Mexico, United States
|
|-
|Win
|align=center|1–0
|Jay Jackson
|Submission (rear-naked choke)
|WXC 52
|
|align=center|1
|align=center|4:12
|Southgate, Michigan, United States
|

See also 

 List of current Bellator MMA fighters
 List of male mixed martial artists

References

External links
 
 

1990 births
Living people
American male mixed martial artists
Mixed martial artists utilizing collegiate wrestling
Mixed martial artists utilizing Brazilian jiu-jitsu
People from Roseville, Michigan
Sportspeople from Metro Detroit
Ultimate Fighting Championship male fighters
American practitioners of Brazilian jiu-jitsu
American male sport wrestlers